Barsarkuchi is a census village in Nalbari district, Assam, India.  According to the 2011 Census of India, Barsarkuchi has a total population of 2,330 people including 1,201 males and 1,129 females with a literacy rate of 78.41%.

References 

Villages in Nalbari district